John Doe is a placeholder name for a party whose true identity is unknown or must be otherwise withheld.

John Doe may also refer to:

Film, television, and radio
 John Doe (Neighbours), fictional character from the Australian soap opera Neighbours
 John Doe (Seven), a character from the film Seven
 John Doe (TV series), an American television show
 "John Doe" (Prison Break), an episode of the American television series Prison Break
 "John Doe" (The X-Files), an episode of the American television series The X-Files
 Meet John Doe, a 1941 comedy drama film
 John Doe, a character on the "Allen's Alley" segments of The Fred Allen Show
 John Doe: Vigilante, a 2014 Australian film

Music
 "John Doe" (song), a 2013 song by American rapper B.o.B
 John Doe (musician) (born 1953), American singer, songwriter, actor, and poet
 Johndoe, Norwegian punk, rock and powerpop band
 "John Doe", a song by the American thrash metal band Testament on their album Demonic
 Songs for John Doe, the 1941 debut album of the Almanac Singers

Other uses
 American Homebuilts John Doe, an American aircraft design
 John Doe (comics), an Italian comic book
 John Doe (whistleblower), pseudonym of the anonymous whistleblower in the Panama Papers leak
 John Doe, a character in the video game Batman: The Enemy Within

See also
 Everyman (disambiguation)
 Citizen X (disambiguation)
 Commoner (disambiguation)
 Jane Doe (disambiguation)
 Jon Dough (1962–2006), American pornographic actor
 John Dough, a gingerbread man brought to life in the Frank Baum book John Dough and the Cherub
 Joe Public (disambiguation)
 John Q. Public
 The Masses (disambiguation)